Sbai (Malay: Sebai; Jawi: سباي;) or phaa biang is a shawl-like garment or breast cloth worn in mainland Southeast Asia. Sbai is worn by women as a silk breast wrapper in Thailand, Laos, and Cambodia, while in coastal Sumatra, Borneo and Malay peninsula, the same term is used to describe a shoulder cloth. The sbai was derived from the Indian sari, the end of which is worn over one shoulder.

Etymology 
Sbai is a Khmer word that refers to any kind of thin and soft garment. In clothing, it specifically refers to a shawl-like garment or breast cloth used mostly by women and to a lesser extent religious men.

History 
Sbai is derived from the Indian sari which may have been introduced to Southeast Asia through the Indianized Kingdoms along with other traditions and elements of Indian culture.

Cambodia 
The sbai of Cambodia was introduced from ancient India as it resembles Indian sari. There are related mythologies in the Khmer culture concerning the history of sbai, which was likely introduced during the Kingdom of Funan alongside chang kben in the first century AD. The sbai is mentioned in the legends of Preah Thong and Neang Neak. In one scene, Preah Thong clings to a piece of cloth worn on the Nagini in order to make the journey to the Nāga's kingdom; that piece of cloth is a sbai. In that tale, the sbai is symbolic of the tail of Neang Neak, the Naga princess.

In Angkorian period, although it was common for men and women to be topless, however clothes for the upper body were worn: the bas reliefs of Bayon, Preah Khan, and other Angkorian temples depict women wearing a shawl-like sbai while religious male figures are adorned with stylized sbai. At Angkor Wat, there are depictions of topless Apsaras holding sbai connected to their sampot, while the northern wall of Angkor Wat depicts a group of ladies wearing long sbai holding various offerings.

Nowadays, sbai along with chang kben and sampot are regarded as Cambodia national costume. The groom also wears a sbai.

For men, especially Brahmin and Buddhist monk, the sbai called sbong sbai trai chivor, and is considered the robe of Hindu and Buddhist monks. For women, sbai can be freely used and in different ways such as to wrapping it around the body, covering the shoulder, and commonly covering the breast and stomach over the left shoulder. Different styles of sbai are used by Cambodian women based on their preferences and traditions.

Laos 

In Laos, this garment is known as phaa biang or sabai. It is common for Lao women to wear sabai as it is considered traditional clothing. A sabai can also be worn by men in weddings or when attending religious ceremonies. The type of sabai typically worn by Lao men often has checkered patterns. Sabai can also be a long piece of silk, about a foot wide, that is draped diagonally over the chest covering one shoulder with one end dropping behind the back.

Malaysia 
In Malaysia, Sebai is a cloth wrapped around the neck to cover the shoulders with both ends hanging on the chest similar to a scarf hung over the shoulders.

Myanmar 

The ethnic Mon is also known to have similar tradition of wearing the shawl-like sabai  called Yat Toot in Mon language, diagonally over the chest covering one shoulder with one end dropping behind the back like that worn by Lao women. This tradition distinguished them from other ethnic groups in Myanmar. The today Mon people of Myanmar and Thailand were the descendants of various Indianized polities notably Dvaravati. Artifacts from Mon Dvaravati sites in what is now Thailand depicted a group of ladies wearing what is similar to sabai.

Thailand 

Dvaravati sites depicting group of ladies wearing what is similar to sabai. 
Sabai or pha biang is shawl-like garment, or breast cloth. Sabais can be used by women or men. The sabai is also known as a long piece of silk, about a foot wide, draped diagonally around the chest by covering one shoulder which its end drops behind the back. Sabais could be worn around the naked chest or on top of another cloth. The practice of wearing Sabai along with Victorian cloth was a common practice during the reign of King Chulalongkorn and lasted until the reign of King Vajiravudh when Westernized clothing became more fashionable.

Gallery

See also
Sampot Chang Kben
Khmer Traditional Dress
Culture of Cambodia
Chut thai
Sampot
Sampot Samloy
Kemben
Malaysian cultural outfits
Sari
Traditional Thai clothing

References

External links

Shawls and wraps
Cambodian clothing
Folk costumes
Laotian clothing
Malay clothing
Thai clothing
History of Asian clothing